Niebyła  is a village in the administrative district of Gmina Dąbrowa Zielona, within Częstochowa County, Silesian Voivodeship, in southern Poland.

The village had a population of 32 at the last count.

References

Villages in Częstochowa County